Gözlükule Research Center is an archaeological research center in Tarsus, Turkey.

It is an abandoned one century-old ginnery. Now it is under restoration. In 2002 it was acquired by the government and in  2007 it was allocated to Boğaziçi University for researches in Tarsus archaeology. Dr Aslı Özyar, the chief of the archaeological team says that up until recently, the ginney was used as a depot and as the restoration progressed a research center was established. The opening ceremony of the research center was held on 18 February 2017. It is planned that the restoration will be complete in one year.

In this center the archaeological research about the neolithic settlement Gözlükule will be carried out. The distance between the center and the excavation site is merely . In the center there will be offices, laboratories, depots and guest houses.

References

Buildings and structures in Mersin Province
Tarsus, Mersin
Research institutes in Turkey
2017 establishments in Turkey